Trésor Ngabo Mossi (born 28 August 2001) is a Burundian footballer who plays as a midfielder for Luxembourgish club UN Käerjéng 97.

Career
Mossi started his career with Burundian side Aigle Noir (Makamba). In 2021, he signed for Westerlo in the Belgian second division.

References

External links
 Trésor Mossi at playmakerstats.com
 

2001 births
Living people
Burundian footballers
Burundi international footballers
Association football midfielders
K.V.C. Westerlo players
UN Käerjéng 97 players
Luxembourg National Division players
Burundian expatriate footballers
Expatriate footballers in Belgium
Burundian expatriate sportspeople in Belgium
Expatriate footballers in Luxembourg
Burundian expatriate sportspeople in Luxembourg